Jabo is a village on Nigeria's A124 highway. It has a mosque. Neighboring villages are Paiko and Gida. A couple miles north is Minna, a half-hour drive. Jabo is close to Kwanti and Pinai Nature Reserves and The Federal University of Technology Minna.

Cities in Nigeria